The Four Quarters is an album written and produced by Vladislav Delay.

Track listing
 The First Quarter 
 The Second Quarter 
 The Third Quarter 
 The Fourth Quarter

Personnel
 Vladislav Delay: producer

References

External links
 

2005 albums
Vladislav Delay albums